Batu Berendam is a small town in Melaka Tengah District, Malacca, Malaysia.

Climate

Place of Worship 
Mosque: Masjid Al-Hidayah Batu Berendam

Buddhist temple: 
 Wat Phra Buddha Jinaraja
 Taiwan Buddhist Tzu Chi Foundation Malaysia (Malacca Branch)

Chinese temple: 
 Ling Yun Ting Temple (灵云亭)
 Wu Sheng Dì Jun Temple (武聖帝君壇)
 Hian Seng Keong Temple (新马六甲花园玄聖宫)

Hindu temple: Sri Subramaniar Devasthanam Temple

Cemetery: Jelutong Chinese Cemetery

Educational institutions

Primary schools 
Sekolah Kebangsaan Batu Berendam
Sekolah Kebangsaan Batu Berendam 2
Sekolah Jenis Kebangsaan (Cina) Wen Hua

Secondary schools 
Sekolah Menengah Kebangsaan Munshi Abdullah
Sekolah Menengah Kebangsaan Tun Mutahir
Sekolah Menengah Kebangsaan Agama Sultan Muhammad

Industrial areas 
 Batu Berendam Industrial Area

Gallery

See also
 List of cities and towns in Malaysia by population

References

Central Melaka District
Towns in Malacca